Dušan Đuričić (Serbian Cyrillic: Душан Ђуричић; born 11 March 1990) is a Serbian football midfielder.

Club career
He made his debut for ViOn Zlaté Moravce against Spartak Trnava on 13 July 2014.

References

External links
 
 Futbalnet profile
 Fortuna Liga profile
 Eurofotbal profile

1990 births
Living people
Serbian footballers
Association football midfielders
FK Bežanija players
FK Voždovac players
FC ViOn Zlaté Moravce players
Slovak Super Liga players
Expatriate footballers in Slovakia
Serbian expatriate sportspeople in Slovakia
Footballers from Belgrade